The rugby sevens competitions at the 2019 Southeast Asian Games in the Philippines took place at the Clark Parade Grounds in Angeles City.

Competition schedule

Source: 2019 SEA Games Official Calendar

Participating nations

Men's tournament

Women's tournament

Men's competition

Group stage

Final round

Women's competition

Group stage

Final round

Medal summary

Medal table

Medalists

References

External links
 

 
rugby sevens
2019
2019 rugby sevens competitions
2019 in Asian rugby union